Irene Pacheco, also known as Mambaco, (born 26 March 1971 in San Juan de Urabá) is a Colombian former professional boxer who competed from 1993 to 2007. He held the IBF flyweight title from 1999 to 2004 and challenged for the WBO bantamweight title in 2007.

Professional career
Pacheco turned pro in 1993 and won the vacant IBF flyweight title with a TKO of Luis Cox Coronado in Barranquilla in April 1999. Over a five-year period, Pacheco successfully defended the belt against boxers such as Masibulele Makepula, Mike Trejo, and Alejandro Félix Montiel, before losing it by TKO in a December 2004 fight against Vic Darchinyan.

In March 2007, he moved up in weight and took on Jhonny González, losing by TKO and announcing his retirement following the fight. He returned to school and received his high school diploma in 2008.

See also 
 List of IBF world champions

References

External links 
 

Living people
1971 births
International Boxing Federation champions
World flyweight boxing champions
World boxing champions
Colombian male boxers
Southpaw boxers
Sportspeople from Antioquia Department